FC Kaysar (Qaısar Fýtbol Klýby) is a Kazakh professional football club based in the Gany Muratbayev Stadium in Kyzylorda. They are founding members of the Kazakhstan Premier League and have missed only three seasons following relegations. The most successful was the season of 1998, where they won the Kazakhstan Cup and came fourth in the league.

History

Names
1968 : Founded as Volna
1969 : Renamed Avtomobilist
1974 : Renamed  Orbita
1979 : Renamed  Meliorator
1990 : Renamed  Kaisar
1996 : Renamed  Kaisar-Munai for sponsorship reasons
1997, July : Renamed  Kaisar-Hurricane for sponsorship reasons
2001 : Renamed Kaisar again

Domestic history

Continental history

Honours
Kazakhstan Cup
Champions (2): 1998, 2019
Kazakhstan First Division
Champions (4): 1995, 2005, 2013, 2016

Current squad

Managers
 Aleksandr Prokhorov (1981–82)
 Marat Esmuratov (2002)
 Bulat Esmagambetov (May 2003)
 Tleuhan Turmagambetov (May 2003 – Oct 06)
 Viktor Kumykov (2003 – Oct 04)
 Sergei Gorokhovodatskiy (2007)
 Vladimir Nikitenko (Jan 1, 2008 – Dec 31, 2008)
 Khazret Dyshekov (April 2009)
 Sultan Abildayev (April 2009 – Aug 09)
 Tleuhan Turmagambetov (Aug 2009)
 Vladimir Linchevskiy (Aug 2009 – Feb 11)
 Algimantas Liubinskas (Jan 2011 – Feb 12)
 Sergei Kogai (Jan 31, 2012 – April 24, 2012)
 Vladimir Nikitenko (April 24, 2012 – Dec 31, 2012)
 Sergei Volgin (Jan 18, 2013 – Nov 17, 2013)
 Dmitriy Ogai (Nov 30, 2013 – July 23, 2015)
 Fyodor Shcherbachenko (Aug 6, 2015 – Nov 10, 2015)
 Stoycho Mladenov (Jan 1, 2017 – Nov 10, 2020)
 Sultan Abildayev (Dec 15, 2020 – Dec 13, 2022)
 Viktor Kumykov (Dec 13, 2022 – )

References

External links
 Official website
 Soccerway profile

 
Football clubs in Kazakhstan
Association football clubs established in 1968
1968 establishments in the Kazakh Soviet Socialist Republic